Adrian Jamal Foncette (born 10 October 1988) is a Trinidadian international footballer who plays for Police, as a goalkeeper.

Club career
Born in Arima, Foncette has played club football for St. Ann's Rangers, Albany Great Danes, North East Stars, Western Mass Pioneers and Police.

International career
After playing for their under-20 and under-23 teams, he made his senior international debut for Trinidad and Tobago in 2016. In Trinidad’s last 2018 World Cup qualifying match, Foncette was described as a "key player" as he made a number of saves to maintain a 2-1 victory over the USA, which eliminated them from qualifying for the World Cup.

References

1988 births
Living people
Trinidad and Tobago footballers
Trinidad and Tobago under-20 international footballers
Trinidad and Tobago international footballers
St. Ann's Rangers F.C. players
Albany Great Danes men's soccer players
North East Stars F.C. players
Western Mass Pioneers players
Police F.C. (Trinidad and Tobago) players
TT Pro League players
Association football goalkeepers
Trinidad and Tobago expatriate footballers
Trinidad and Tobago expatriate sportspeople in the United States
Expatriate soccer players in the United States
2019 CONCACAF Gold Cup players
2021 CONCACAF Gold Cup players